The New Age is the central organ of the Communist Party of India. The first editor was S. V. Ghate and started in 1934 as a monthly journal. Binoy Viswam is the current editor of New Age Weekly.

Columns

Education
Study and Struggle
Authored by C. Adhikesavan

International
Diary of International Events. Authored by C. Adhikesavan.

Other columns include Current Issues and Book Reviews.
Glimpses from the Lives of Our Great Leaders
Authored by Anil Rajimwale
What the Others Say
 On Records

References

Weekly newspapers published in India
English-language newspapers published in India
Weekly journals
English-language communist newspapers
Communist Party of India
Communist newspapers
Communist periodicals published in India
Publications established in 1934
1934 establishments in India